CX or Cx may refer to:

Businesses and organizations
 Cathay Pacific, a Hong Kong airline (IATA code CX)
 Cemex, a Mexican building materials supply company (New York Stock Exchange symbol "CX")
 Connex Melbourne, a former Australian train operator
 Fuji TV, or CX, a Japanese television network

Science and technology

Biology and medicine
 Circumflex artery (disambiguation), multiple arteries of the human body
 Phosgene oxime, a chemical warfare agent

Computing
 An interface in IP Multimedia Subsystems, using the diameter protocol, between Home Subscriber Server and Application Server
 CX register, a general-purpose 16-bit X86 register
 C++/CX (component extensions), a language extension for C++ compilers from Microsoft that enables C++ programmers to write programs for the Windows Runtime (WinRT)

Other uses in science and technology
 CX (noise reduction), a noise reduction system, most notably used for the analog audio tracks of LaserDiscs
 Cx, an abbreviation for the Building Commissioning process
 Drag coefficient (  or )

Places
 Christmas Island ISO 3166-1 alpha-2 code
 .cx, the top-level domain for Christmas Island

Transportation
 Citroën CX, a French executive car
 Honda CX series, a Japanese motorcycle range
 Mitsubishi Concept-cX, a Japanese subcompact SUV concept
 Mazda CX, the prefix for Mazda's crossover and SUV lineup

Other uses
 110 (number), in Roman numerals
 Chron X, a digital collectible card game
 Cross-examination debate, also known as Policy debate, a form of speech competition
 Customer experience, the experiences a customer has with a supplier of goods or services
 Cyclo-cross, a form of bicycle racing
 Nikon CX format, an image sensor format
 Ĉ, a letter in the Esperanto alphabet
 Cx, a smiling emoticon
 Cx, referencing popular streamer Ice Poseidon

See also

 CXX (disambiguation)
 CCX (disambiguation)
 C+ (disambiguation)